Number 96: The Movie is an Australian drama film, released in 1974 and based on the television soap opera of the same title that was then running on the 0-10 network. The film features nearly all the show's regular cast, and was created by the show's creative team, Cash Harmon Productions with the screenplay by David Sale and Johnny Whyte and directed by Peter Benardos and Brian Phillis.

The film's drawcard was that the picture was shot in color, whilst at that time the regular serial was still broadcasting in monochrome. The film also has more revealing nudity than was allowed on TV at the time.

Plot

The film starts with Vera Collins being gang raped by a group of bikers, which affects troubled romance with politician Nick Brent. She starts a new business endeavour with Maggie Cameron and Simon Carr, a character that they had a bitter rivalry over in the regular TV series.
 
Vera ends up in bed with Simon who is unable to perform. It turns out that he is in fact gay and he has an affair with lawyer Don Finlayson.

Vera falls in love with Nick Brent, but when she meets his son Tony, she realises that he was the leader of the bikies who had raped her. Tony recognises Vera and tries to run her over at Dorrie and Herb's fancy dress party. He hits Simon instead, and whilst making another run at Vera, his car hits a brick wall and explodes. Simon recovers and Vera goes on to marry Nick, who later becomes Prime Minister.
 
Meanwhile, former Number 96 resident Sonia Freeman (who filmed all of her scenes in just one day) returns after her release from a mental asylum. Sonia is now married to newspaper journalist Duncan Hunter. Her forgetful episodes and hallucinations become increasingly erratic and deranged. This worries Duncan, Sonia's good friend Jack Sellars and his new girlfriend, flight attendant Diana Moore, who has moved into flat 6. It is revealed that Diana and Duncan are secretly scheming to drive Sonia insane. Jack and the police arrive just in time before Diana and Duncan can persuade Sonia to kill herself.

Aldo Godolfus has been fraudulently withholding cash takings from the deli to avoid paying income tax, but loses the money in a fire. He takes a night job at the Connaught Rooms function hall to recoup the losses.

Many of the residents become embroiled in the major plans for Dorrie and Herb's ruby wedding celebrations. After looking at her marriage certificate, however, Dorrie discovers that the best man, Horace Deerman, signed where the groom should have. Believing this means she that she is married actually to Horace, she tracks him down with Herb and Flo; he is revealed as a derelict alcoholic, who, much to her dismay, takes a fancy to her.

Les Whittaker, unbeknownst to his wife Norma, enlists Herb and Alf to assist in his new business venture: a sauna in the building's basement.

Cast

The film featured the majority of actors that starred in the regular serial. Actors marked with an asterisk did not appear in the serial and were exclusive to the film version.

 Johnny Lockwood as Aldo Godolfus
 Philippa Baker as Roma Godolfus
 Gordon McDougall as Les Whittaker
 Sheila Kennelly as Norma Whittaker
 Pat McDonald as Dorrie Evans
 Ron Shand as Herb Evans
 Bunney Brooke as Flo Patterson
 Joe Hasham as Don Finlayson
 Tom Oliver as Jack Sellars
 Rebecca Gilling* as Diana Moore
 Lynn Rainbow as Sonia Freeman
 Alister Smart* as Duncan Hunter
 James Elliott as Alf Sutcliffe
 Elisabeth Kirkby as Lucy Sutcliffe
 Jeff Kevin as Arnold Feather
 Elaine Lee as Vera Collins
 Chard Hayward as Dudley Butterfield
 Bettina Welch as Maggie Cameron
 Thelma Scott as Claire Houghton
 Harry Lawrence* (1925–2004) as Horace Deerman
 John Orcsik as Simon Carr
 James Condon* as Nicholas Brent
 Patrick Ward* as Tony Brent

Uncredited

 Paul Chubb as the sauna delivery man
 Phillip Avalon (biker) 
 Caz Lederman (biker) 
 Albie Thomas (biker)

Production and release

The film was shot in December 1973 over 11 days in colour on 16mm film and then blown up to 35mm.

The film was released with a star studded red carpet premiere and brass band in Sydney at the Regent Theatre in May 1974 during the school holidays and ran for around 9–10 weeks, becoming a major box office success. It screened in Melbourne during the August school holidays and was still on the drive-in circuit during January 1975. In Brisbane, Channel 0 telecast the stars' arrival live during that night's regular Friday night episode.

A gay kiss between series regular Don Finlayson (played by Joe Hasham) and Simon Carr (played by John Orcsik was mysteriously cut from the movie after its Sydney season.

Reception

The film was a hit, grossing AU$2,476,471 at the box office. It became the fifth highest grossing movie of the 1970s behind Mad Max and just ahead of Caddie.

Critics were not kind to the film, but even Mike Harris from The Australian had to admit he had never been in a cinema before where every character's first appearance got a roar of approval from the crowd.

References

External links
 
 Number 96 at Oz Movies

1974 films
Australian drama films
Films based on television series
Films set in Sydney
1970s English-language films